Nahr al-Bared (Arabic: نهر البارد, literally: Cold River) may refer to: 

 Nahr al-Bared Palestine refugee camp in northern Lebanon
 Nahr al-Bared, a river in northern Lebanon
 Nahr al-Bared, a village in Syria